White Slave Traffic is a 1926 German silent thriller film directed by Jaap Speyer and starring Rudolf Klein-Rogge, Erich Kaiser-Titz, and Fritz Alberti. When a Berlin nightclub worker moves to Budapest to take up a job that has been arranged for her, she finds herself being kidnapped by white slave traffickers. She is eventually rescued from a brothel in Athens. The film opened with a warning from a group committed to combating white slavery, but the film's sensationalist tone provoked controversy. In Britain it was refused a licence by the British Board of Film Censors although it is possible it had some private screenings. One contemporary review described it as "crude melodrama on an unpleasant subject".

Cast

References

Bibliography

External links

1926 films
1920s thriller films
German thriller films
Films of the Weimar Republic
German silent feature films
Films directed by Jaap Speyer
Films set in Berlin
Films set in Budapest
Films set in Athens
Films about prostitution in Greece
German black-and-white films
Silent thriller films
1920s German films